The Marathi-language television industry was started in India in 1984. Although earlier confined to a half an hour slot in the national television Doordarshan, the industry has now expanded with many commercial TV channels currently on air. Various dedicated categories like news and movies have been added and have considerably expanded the horizon of Marathi TV Entertainment.

Marathi News Channels

The Marathi Television got its first round-the-clock news channel in the form of Saam TV in the year 2008 leading marathi News channel in the state. Nilesh Khare is the Channel Head and Editor of the channel since 2018. Zee 24 Taas was launched in year 2007. Disney Star launched its Marathi news channel Star Majha in June 2007, which was later named as ABP Majha from 1 June 2012. Network 18 and Lokmat together formed a joint venture to launch IBN Lokmat in 2008 and which was later renamed as News18 Lokmat. In 2008, Sakal media Groups launched its first venture in Television with Saam TV. Firstly it was info entertainment, but from 1 January 2018 it become a leading Marathi News Channel. In 2009, TV9 Maharashtra launched. On 1 May 2013 another channel launched, namely Jai Maharashtra, by Mumbai-based media group Sahana Films. Lokshahi News channel was launched on 26 January 2020 by Swaraj Marathi Broadcasting LLP.

List of Channels

Government Owned Channel

General Entertainment Channels (GEC)

Defunct Channels

Movies

Music

Defunct Channel

Kids

Defunct Channel

Sports

Defunct Channel

News

Defunct Channel

Marathi HD Channels

See also
List of 4K channels in India
List of HD channels in India

Lists of television channels by language
Marathi-language television
Mumbai-related lists
Lists of television channels in India